Marinette High School is a public high school serving grades 9 through 12 in the city of Marinette, Wisconsin. It is part of the School District of Marinette, and had an estimated enrollment of 623 for the 2014–15 school year. It is the only public high school in Marinette.

Academics 
MHS offers Advanced Placement classes, which six percent of the student body participates in.

Demographics 
The school is 95 percent White, two percent Hispanic, one percent black, one percent Asian, and one-half percent American Indian. Just under half of the students who attend MHS are economically disadvantaged. About a third of students are proficient in English and math.

From 2000 to 2019, high school enrollment declined 39.1%.

Enrollment at Marinette High School, 2000–2019

History 
On November 29, 2010, sophomore Sam Hengel held a teacher and 24 students captive for five hours at gunpoint before shooting himself. He carried two pistols and a knife into school and made students hand over their cell phones. The teacher in the room served as a mediator during the ordeal. Reports indicated that Hengel never pointed the gun at students, and that he never had any specific plan on what to do. He died the following morning from his injuries.

Athletics 
Marinette High School shares a historic football rivalry with the neighboring high school in Menominee, Michigan for over a century, dating back to 1894.

Notable alumni 
 Jug Girard (1927–1997), football player
 Ed Glick (1900–1976), football player
 George Ihler (born 1943), football player
 Joe Kresky (1908–1988), football player
 Charles Lavine (born 1947), Democratic member of the New York State Assembly
 Jab Murray (1892–1958), football player
 John Nygren (born 1964), Republican member of the Wisconsin State Assembly
 Sammy Powers (1897–1969), football player
 Patrick Testin (born 1988), President pro tempore of the Wisconsin Senate
 Buff Wagner (1897–1962), football player

References

External links 
Official website: "About The School" page

Schools in Marinette County, Wisconsin
Public high schools in Wisconsin